Deniz Yücel (born 10 September 1973) is a German-Turkish journalist and publisher. He has been a contributor to several German publications, most notably Die Tageszeitung and Die Welt.

Espionage accusations and imprisonment 
The Turkish government repeatedly accused Yücel of espionage on behalf of Germany's federal intelligence agency, the Bundesnachrichtendienst, and in support of the alleged terrorist organizations FETÖ and PKK. The government further claimed that Yücel aided these two groups in inciting violence in Turkey.  In a speech in 2017, Turkish President Recep Tayyip Erdogan declared that Yücel "is a spy, not a journalist".

On 14 February 2017, Yücel was formally indicted by a Turkish court and imprisoned for espionage.  His incarceration was widely criticized by journalists, politicians, and the German public. Sigmar Gabriel, the German Minister of Foreign Affairs, immediately summoned the Turkish ambassador to the Foreign Office to protest Yücel's sentence. On 16 February 2018, just over a year after his imprisonment began, Yücel was released. On 28 June 2019, the Constitutional Court of Turkey ruled that the detention of Yücel had been unlawful.

Yücel received strong public and political support in Germany throughout his imprisonment such as the one of Cem Özdemir or the one of the popular Twitter hashtag #FreeDeniz campaign. The German newspaper Die Welt, for which Yücel is a correspondent, offered to forward letters of support to the journalist. It also published Yücel's prison address in Turkey and suggested that letters written in Turkish could be sent directly to the journalist's prison cell. The Prison letter reading commission at times only let him read the letters of his mother-in-law, but not those of his wife.

On 25 January 2022, the European Court of Human Rights (ECHR) ruled that Turkey had violated Deniz Yücel's human rights. The court ruled that Yücel's pre-trial detention violated his rights in three cases, including his right to liberty and security, right to compensation for unlawful detention, as well as freedom of expression.

Works 
 Taksim ist überall. Die Gezi-Bewegung und die Zukunft der Türkei. 2014, . 
 Und morgen die ganze Türkei. Der lange Aufstieg des Recep Tayyip Erdoğan, in: Kursbuch 188, 27 November 2016 (excerpts here).
 Wir sind ja nicht zum Spaß hier. Edition Nautilus, Hamburg 2018, 
 Agentterrorist. Eine Geschichte über Freiheit und Freundschaft, Demokratie und Nichtsodemokratie. Kiepenheuer & Witsch, Cologne 2019,

See also 
 Censorship in Turkey
 List of arrested journalists in Turkey
 Germany–Turkey relations
 Turkey's media purge after the failed July 2016 coup d'état

References

External links 
 

Turkish journalists
German journalists
German male journalists
German newspaper journalists
Journalists imprisoned in Turkey
1973 births
Prisoners and detainees of Turkey
Living people
Articles containing video clips
Die Welt people
Die Tageszeitung people
21st-century German journalists